"When U Cry I Cry" is a song performed by Jesse Campbell (then known as Jesse), issued as the lead single from his debut album Never Let You Go. The song peaked at #29 on the Billboard R&B chart in 1995.

Charts

Weekly charts

Year-end charts

References

Capitol Records singles
1995 debut singles
Jesse Campbell (singer) songs
1995 songs